Calvin Waters Christian (September 8, 1905 – January 14, 1997), of California, was a philatelist known to his fellow philatelists as “Bert.”

Collecting interests
Bert specialized in the collecting and study of classic United States stamps, but was especially known for his collection and detailed study of the United States 1861 series of postage stamps. He was particularly interested in stamps of that era that were printed and issued with an ink-absorbent grille on their face. His collection of 1861 one cent Franklin stamps was award-winning when displayed at stamp exhibitions.

Philatelic literature
Christian wrote extensively, based on his studies, including a series of articles in The American Philatelist and another series in the Bulletin of the Philatelic Foundation. Much of Christian’s unpublished research was eventually published by Don L. Evans in his book, The United States 1¢ Franklin 1861-1867.

Philatelic activity
“Bert” Christian was active in a number of philatelic societies. At the U.S. Philatelic Classics Society he served as president, vice president, and director. He was also a frequent contributor to the Chronicle of U.S. Classic Postal Issues.

Honors and awards
Christian was presented with both the Chase and Brookman cups by the U.S. Philatelic Classics Society. He was also awarded the Luff Award for Distinguished Philatelic Research in 1993 by the American Philatelic Society. In 1998 he was named to the American Philatelic Society Hall of Fame.

See also
 Philately
 Philatelic literature

External links
 APS Hall of Fame - Calvin Waters Christian

1905 births
1997 deaths
Philatelic authors
American philatelists
Writers from California
Place of birth missing
Place of death missing
American Philatelic Society